Taryatu-Chulutu ("rocks of Tariat") is a volcanic field in Mongolia. It is part of a volcanic area in Central Asia in the Hangai range that may be linked to the rifting of the Lake Baikal Rift. The field itself is located within the valleys of the Chuluut and Suman rivers. Volcanic activity occurred in the Miocene, Pliocene, Pleistocene and Holocene. The Khorgo cinder cone erupted during the Holocene and lava flows from it formed a lava dam generating Terkhiin Tsagaan Nuur lake.

Geological context 
The volcanic field lies in the Taryatu depression, on the northern slope of the Hangai range. There, the field spans the river valleys of the Chuluut River, its tributary Gichigin and the Suman River rivers. The field is sometimes named Tariat volcanic field after the town of Tariat. Rivers frequently run in canyons bordered by lava plains.

Tectonically, the field is located within the Tarvagatay terrane which formed 3,000-200 mya ago and between 1,000 and 250 mya was accreted into the Central Asian Orogenic Belt. This terrane is formed by amphibolite, gneiss, migmatite and schist. An anorthosite pluton has yielded ages of 3,050 mya and is the oldest age from this terrane. Following stabilization of the whole Hangai region in the Paleozoic, only in the late Cenozoic did tectonic activity recommence.

Volcanism in this field appears to be related to volcanism which is widespread in this part of Asia. Localized asthenosphere upwellings may be responsible for these volcanic events at Hangai and other volcanic centres around Lake Baikal. Other theories for the Hangai postulate a mantle plume or the removal of part of the lithosphere by asthenospheric currents.

Geology 
The volcanism is exposed in river terraces of the Chulutu river. The  terraces formed during the Miocene and the  terraces in the Pliocene. Lava sheets in the lower two thirds of the Pliocene layers are thicker than the upper lava flows. The  terrace of the Chulutu river and the  terraces in the Taryatu river are of Pleistocene age. The depression itself however does not appear to contain lavas from this plateau.

It is not clear if the lava flow and the pyroclastic deposit were formed by the same volcanic eruption.

In the western part of the depression, six Holocene cinder cones are found which have generated lava flows. These cones include Khorog and Dzan Tologai. An arcuate chain of volcanoes named Odnobokii, Listvennichnyi, and Sosnovyi is found directly southwest of Khorog/Khorgo. The first volcano has a crater lip in its side, while the other two volcanoes are partly buried in lava flows. These lava flows show sag structures formed by the collapse of lava tubes.

Among the components of the cone are scoria and large blocks of basalt. The cone is breached at the location of a lava tube. Very little soil is developed on the Khorgo lavas. Lavas from this cone dammed a river, generating the Terkhiin Tsagaan Lake. The eruption of Khorgo was probably fed from a north-northeast striking eruption fissure.

Composition 
Augitite, potassic limburgite, pyroxene trachybasalts and trachyte-andesite are found in the Pliocene layers. Potassic basanite and limburgite are found in the Pleistocene layers. Holocene layers contain augitite, leucite basanite, potassic hawaiite and leucite tephrite. Horgo/Khorgo is constructed from phonolitic tephrite and its lavas range alkali basalt-basanite. There is a clear trend in increasing  and alkali content during the Pleistocene and the Holocene, indicating together with the xenolith content that the origin of these recent basalts is deep.

Xenoliths are also found in the Pliocene layers and are composed of peridotite, sanidine and spinel-lherzolite. Pleistocene layers contain ultramafic xenoliths, with the youngest Holocene flows containing the largest amounts. Shavaryn-Tsaram is particularly well known as a source of xenoliths. In the 1970s and 1980s this volcano was prospected and mined for garnets.

Eruptive history 
Volcanic activity in the field ranges from Pliocene to Holocene, commencing about 8 mya ago. The Shavaryn-Tsaram volcano has an age of 1.2 mya. Seismic tomography has identified traces of a former magmatic intrusion under the volcanic field.

The Khorgo/Horgo cinder cones was considered to be about 4 ka old,  dating on organic material in its sediments has indicated ages of 8 ka. The Global Volcanism Program indicates a date of 2980 BCE ± 150 years. Some geologists have correlated the activity of Paektusan, Udokan Plateau and Wudalianchi volcanoes elsewhere in Asia and have presumed that common geologic events did influence the activity of all three centres.

Environment 

Khorgo volcano is part of the Khorgo-Terkhiin Tsagaan Nuur National Park, which was established in 1965. Most precipitation in the area falls during summer.

References 

Volcanoes of Mongolia
Miocene volcanism
Pliocene volcanism
Pleistocene volcanism
Holocene volcanism